Star Fairies was a doll toy series of the 1980s made by the Tonka company. The dolls had different costumes and personalities. Star Fairies was adapted into a televised special, made by Hanna-Barbera in 1985. Family Home Entertainment released the special on VHS in 1986.

Television film 
The film is about a princess Star Fairy named Sparkle (B.J. Ward) who lives up in the clouds in Castle WishStar. Sparkle's job is to grant wishes to children who wish upon a star, but lately she has been overwhelmed by the increasing number of wishes being made. So she asks for help from the Wishing Well (Jonathan Winters), who instructs her to go to Mount Wishmore and wish on a shooting star. She does so and receives five new star fairy helpers named: True Love (Jean Casem), Whisper (Noelle North), Jazz (Susan Blu), Spice (Didi Conn), and Nightsong (Ta-Tanisha). As the story goes on, the fairies meet a little girl named Hillary (Drew Barrymore), who is upset but cannot think of a wish to make her happy. Hillary and other Star Fairies then seek help from Princess Sparkle.  When Hillary and the Star Fairies return to Castle WishStar, they discover Princess Sparkle's Wand has been stolen by a group of short, hairy elves, and their leader, Bungle Boss, who have also made off with the Wishing Well.  This sends them on a journey to recover the wand.

Tonka toys and Star Fairy dolls 
In the early 1980s Tonka Toys manufactured an unusual line of dolls called the Star Fairies the series consisted of six dolls. All dolls were marked on the back of their heads Hornby (c) 1983. They stood about 6" tall. They had swivel heads; fully moveable arms/legs with a twist waist, the legs were also bendable. They had pointed elfish ears and pixie faces. Each fairy came with her own purple brush, a silver star wand and a white base (so each could stand upright). The wings were made of a fabric and placed over a flexible plastic white cut-out frame. These fairies were said to make your wishes come true. All boxes for dolls had the Item # 7700;

Princess Sparkle was a blonde with blue eyes. She wore a pale pink gown, silver crown and had pale pink wings.

Whisper had dark brown hair with brown eyes. She wore a lavender gown and had matching lavender wings.

Spice had dark red hair with green eyes. She wore a short golden yellow dress and had dark yellow wings.

True Love had platinum blonde hair with brown eyes. She wore a short white dress with magenta and pale blue wings.

Night Song had straight dark brown hair with brown eyes and a brown flesh tone. She wore a pale blue and white dress with matching blue wings.

Jazz had straight blonde hair with blue eyes. She had an interesting pink and wine outfit with harem-like sheer pants with matching wine and pink wings.

A special deluxe edition Royal Princess Sparkle was made too. She had special holographic wings encased in plastic and came with a special star wand that would allow you to look thru it to see the lovely multi-rainbow colors trapped in her wings. This version of the Princess Sparkle had a more elaborately designed outfit in purple, white and silver. Her crown also was different from the one on the standard version doll. She also came with a brush and white base. Item number for this special edition doll was #7701.

Some of the other accessories that came with these dolls were;

Lavender the Magical Unicorn was a lavender colored unicorn/pegasus with a silky white hair mane/tail and a pearly spiral horn. Like the fairies she had clip-on pale pink and lavender wings which attached to a bar located on her sides. Underneath the bar was a small protrusion so that a Star Fairy Coach could also be attached to her body so that she could whisk the fairies away to the clouds and the land of WishComeTrue. Lavender came with her very own hair brush too, however, she was not marked. Some of the coaches had a number imprinted on the inside (but not all of them), the coach was a pale pink with a lavender interior and wheels and was highlighted with silver accents. Lavender was sold and packaged in two versions, by herself (Item # 7704)  as well as paired with the coach (Item # 7705).

There were also the Star Fairies Animal Friends; these three animals were made of a soft PVC and covered with a soft flocking. They were especially designed so that the Star Fairies could sit on them. The most unusual feature was their eyes, which had white "stars" on them. They were given special powers and helped the fairies with their wishful tasks, all boxes had the Item # 7703;

Dipper the playful little gray kitten had blue eyes. The bottom was stamped Tonka (c) Tonka Corp. 1985, made in Taiwan 807654.

Lady the elegant young light gray swan had gray eyes. Her bottom was stamped Tonka (c) Tonka Corp. 1985, made in Taiwan 807656.

Jitter the shy light beige baby bunny had orange-brown eyes. The bottom was stamped Tonka (c) Tonka Corp. 1985, made in Taiwan 807652.

There was a play center called Castle Wish Star where the fairies lived and played together. Embedded in the clouds, this celestial lavender castle had a white stairway leading to two doors. On the inside was a special cloud sleeping chamber, a throne for the Princess, a cloud bathtub complete with a privacy door, and a place to hang the fairies' extra clothing. Included was a spinning May-Pole with purple ribbons, upon which three dolls could be placed and spun. The item number of this product was # 7707 .

Also made was a Wish Keeper Jewel Box. This was a pink box which opened and had a chair for a Fairy doll to sit in and look in the vanity mirror. There were drawers where accessories could be kept (or little girls' treasures). It had a small closet so that clothing and wings could be stored too.

The Star Fairies had six different fashion outfits which included a pair of color coordinating wings to match their new outfit. All packages had the item #7702 in the lower corner.

 Moonlight Lilac Ball Gown
 
Pink Clouds Night Gown

Golden Glow Evening Gown

Star Shower Rain Cape & Pants
 
Emerald Sky Dancin' Dress

Red Twilight Party Dress

References

External links 

 

1985 animated films
Tonka brands
1980s toys
Doll brands
Hanna-Barbera animated films
Hanna-Barbera television specials
1985 television films
1985 films
Films based on Hasbro toys
American animated television films
1980s American animated films
American children's animated fantasy films
Films about princesses
Films about fairies and sprites
Tonka films
Films directed by Ray Patterson (animator)